In Search of Our Origins: How the Quran Can Help in Scientific Research is a research based, non-fiction book written by Jamshed Akhtar.

The author is involved in the study of revealed knowledge, contained in the Qur'an and other religious scriptures for last several years. In the present book, he presents several pointers from the epistemological study of the Qur'an on the origin of life and man. These pointers try to explain where the life was created on the primeval earth, what is its link with the man, and how, where and when the first ancestor of modern man and his mate were created on earth.

The research presented in the book differs from the traditional view and presents support from standard lexicons to explain how the Qur'anic/Arabic words were originally understood by Bedouins of the area.

The book also argues that the phenomenon of Revelation is global and non-human, and several of its premises such as the human pair was born 59000 years ago from a female of a previous specie(s) are likely to generate a lot of controversy amongst the traditionalists of all faiths.

The book suggests "collective scientific investigation" of the information by a panel of linguists, science historians and scientists of various disciplines, for in-depth verification of the research and premises made in the book. The book has outlined a mechanism based on information theory precepts for this purpose.

Author's earlier book The Ultimate Revelations published in 1996 was a science fiction based on Qur'an.

External links
 Review (in Urdu) by Dr. Mohammad Rafat, Professor, Deptt. of Applied Sciences & Humanities, Jamia Millia Islamia University, Delhi, published in Dawat Newspaper dated January 16, 2011.

2010 non-fiction books
Philosophy of science books